The 2012 PV Gas Vietnamese Super Cup Final was the 14th edition of the Vietnamese Super Cup, an annual football match contested by the winners of the previous season's V-League and Vietnamese Cup competitions.

Match details

See also 
2012 V-League
2012 Vietnamese Cup

References 

Super Cup
Vietnamese Super Cup